On 14 January 2023, at approximately 13:30, a drive-by shooting was committed with a shotgun outside St Aloysius Roman Catholic Church in Euston, London, where a memorial service for two women had just ended. 

Six people were injured: four women (one of whom suffered potentially life-changing injuries) and two children, a twelve-year-old and a seven-year-old girl, the latter of whom was taken to hospital in life-threatening condition. She was later reported to be in a stable condition. Police appealed for information about a black car, believed to be a Toyota C-HR, that the shots were fired from.

The memorial service was for Fresia Calderon and her daughter Sara Sanchez who had died separately from natural causes in November 2022. Fresia's ex-husband, Carlos Arturo Sanchez-Coronado, was arrested in Colombia and extradited to the United Kingdom for money laundering for a London drugs gang linked to the Cali Cartel, and was jailed in 2009, serving his sentence and then moving to Santiago, where he died in 2022. This led to speculation that the attack was linked to the cartel, although Scotland Yard refused to discuss motive.

In the early hours of 16 January 2023, London's Metropolitan Police announced that a 22-year-old man had been arrested on suspicion of attempted murder. He had been detained a few hours earlier, after police stopped a car in the Borough of Barnet. He was later bailed until mid-February.

Reactions 
Leader of the Opposition Sir Keir Starmer, in whose constituency the attack occurred, called for tighter restrictions on who can own pump-action shotguns.

References

2023 in London
2023 mass shootings in Europe
2020s crimes in London
2020s mass shootings in the United Kingdom
Mass shootings in London
Attacks in the United Kingdom in 2023
Drive-by shootings
January 2023 crimes in Europe
January 2023 events in the United Kingdom
Non-fatal shootings